"Fuck Up Some Commas" (edited version titled "Commas") is a song by American rapper Future. The song appeared on his acclaimed 2014 mixtape Monster and was later released as the first single from his third studio album DS2.

Music video
A music video for the song, directed by Motion Family, was released on March 27, 2015. The video features cameo appearances by Lil Boosie, Young Scooter, Metro Boomin, and Curtis Williams, alongside the track's producers DJ Spinz and Southside. Rap-Up defined the videoclip "showy", while Zach Frydenlud of Complex magazine called it "extravagant".

Critical reception
Rolling Stone ranked "Fuck Up Some Commas" at number 8 on its year-end list to find the 50 best songs of 2015.

Remix
The official remix was released featuring additional verses from Big Sean and Rick Ross. Rapper Lil Wayne released his own remix. Nasty C and A-Reece freestyled the song at Sway in The Morning.

Chart performance
The song peaked at number 55 on the US Billboard Hot 100 and spent a total of 20 weeks on the chart. On June 10, 2020, the song was certified triple platinum by the Recording Industry Association of America (RIAA) for sales of over three million units in the United States.

Track listing
Digital download 
"F*ck Up Some Commas" – 3:57

Digital download 
"Commas" – 3:56

Charts

Certifications

References

External links
 
 

2014 songs
2015 singles
Future (rapper) songs
Epic Records singles
Songs written by Future (rapper)
Songs written by DJ Spinz
Songs written by Southside (record producer)